The MC68340 is a high-performance 32-bit microprocessor with direct memory access (DMA).

Features 

 High Functional Integration on a Single Piece of Silicon
 Two-Channel Low-Latency DMA Controller for High-Speed Memory Transfers
 Two-Channel Universal Synchronous/Asynchronous Receiver/Transmitter (USART)
 Two Independent Counter/Timers
 System Integration Module Incorporates Many Functions Typically Relegated to External PALs, TTL, and ASIC
 32 Address Lines, 16 Data Lines
 Power Consumption Control
 0–16.78 MHz or 0–25.16 MHz Operation
 144-Pin Ceramic Quad Flat Pack (CQFP) or 145-Pin Plastic Pin Grid Array (PGA)
 Available in 3.3 and 5V

Family
The MC68340 is one of a series of components in Motorola's M68300 Family. Other members of the family
include the MC68302, MC68330, MC68331, MC68332, and MC68F333.

Sources
Product Brief MC68340
User’s Manual
Freescale semiconductors

68k microprocessors